Club Deportivo Once Municipal was a Salvadoran football team from Ahuachapán that last competed in the Primera División, the premier division of Football in El Salvador, in 2018. It was nicknamed "The Canarian Tank", and its home stadium was Estadio Simeón Magaña, which has a capacity of 5,000.

Founded in 1945 and dissolved in 2022

History

Foundation and early years 
Once Municipal was founded on 20 August 1945 by Salvador Marinero, who arrived in Ahuachapán from San Vicente in 1946. He was the owner of a factory in Ahuachapán. After discussing the venture with his neighbors, he put together a football team to play in El Salvador's second division.

After a year of managing the team, Marinero asked Don Alfonso Salaverría, a property tycoon and the mayor of Ahuachapán, to help the team with equipment, finances, and logistics. Salaverría accepted Marinero's invitation, but wanted to see the team play first. Salaverría observed a practice at Llano del Espino, a field on the outskirts of the city where the team was based, but was unimpressed with the quality of the players. He issued instructions for Once Municipal to be reinforced with second division players such as defender René "Chacuate" Moscoso, a shoemaker. Salaverría signed Moscoso despite Marinero's protests against Moscoso's young age.

The club was officially founded after Salaverría gave the team one colon for player wages. It played its first game in August 1946 against Ferrocarril, which Once won 3–1. Their first season was a success, finishing second on the league standings.

1948–49: First national league title 
In 1948, the team was promoted to the Primera Division, the highest league in El Salvadorian football. Due to the team's successful previous seasons, Salaverría began recruiting more players and staff, including two Costa Ricans (the first to play in Salvadoran football) and coach Armando Chacón of FAS for the 1948–49 season. The team's first season in Primera Division was a success, with Once Municipal finishing first in the national tournament and winning a title.

1950s–1960s: After the title 
After the club won the national title, the players demanded more money. As Salaverría couldn't afford to keep paying large player salaries, a large exodus of players began in the "First Canary Leak", most leaving for other first division teams and the newly founded Atlético Marte. In the 1950–51 season, the club was punished with demotion to the fourth division for not paying its players. When the club regrouped financially, it quickly rose through the leagues, again achieving qualification to Primera Division in 1955. However, more financial problems led Salaverría to sell Once Municipal's 1959 Primera Division spot to Atlético Constancia (later Alianza F.C.) for one colon.   Once Municipal was promoted again to the first division in 1963, where it led an average performance as a midtable team. However, another fiasco arose in 1969–70 when players and management once again disagreed on wages, leading to a large exodus of players and the relegation of the club.

1970s: Second ascent
In the 1970s, Once Municipal management decided to try to secure the team its own field. They turned to Arturo Simeón Magaña, the landowner of the area around El Zapotón, the field where Once Municipal played. Simeón Magaña decided to donate the land to the team on the condition that the team "would be the pride of Ahuachapán".

With a new stadium, Once Municipal became a dominant team in the 1970s. Although they were not able to win any titles, they finished at the top of the table in 1978 and 1979.

1980s–1990s: Sharp Decline 
In 1980, Once Municipal was again relegated, this time for poor performance in the league. The club remained in Second Division for the next fifteen years, and was even briefly demoted to Third Division in 1993.

2004–2006: League and Cup Double 
The controversial Adalid Magaña took over the team in 1999 to save it from financial crisis.

Once was not a favorite to be promoted the Primera circuit in 2004. Financial problems continued to plague the team and many worried that it would go bankrupt. The Once Lobos were the firm candidate in the league to gain direct promotion and had experienced players such as Memo Rivera and William Renderos, as well as Edwin Portillo as a coach. However, Once Municipal won 3–2 on the afternoon of 22 May 2004 in an unexpected upset against the Lobos at Estadio Cuscatlán with a hat trick by Colombian Víctor Jaramillo that solidified Once's place at the top of the Segunda Division and its place in the Primera Division the next season, returning to the top tier for the first time in 25 years.

In 2006, the club had its most successful period ever under Nelson Mauricio Ancheta, who filled the roster with players released by more prominent teams. The club won its first Copa Presidente with a 1–0 victory over C.D. Águila on 22 November, giving the club its second ever title. Once also won the grand final of the 2006 Apertura Tournament on 17 December against C.D. FAS. Although they began trailing in the scoreline with an own goal by Nelson Nerio, Once equalised with seven minutes remaining, which sent the game into overtime, where Once were able to score two more goals and win 3–1, to clinch the club's second league title and third overall title while completing a league and cup double.

2007–2014: Promotions and Relegations 
In 2008, the team was once again relegated to the Second Division due to poor management, coaching errors and the underperformance of high-earning players.

In 2010 the club won their relegation/promotion battle with Municipal Limeño to regain promotion to Primera Division. The club was relegated at the end of the next season but were given a reprieve after Atletico Balboa was demoted due to their failure to pay the league. Once was finally relegated at the end of the Clausura 2013 season.

Demise and new club
On 17 January 2018 Once Municipal were stripped of their football license due to unpaid fees to Segunda Division and lack of payments to players and coaches.

On 20 July 2019, a new club was founded by members of the defunct Once Municipal. It acquired the spot of C.D. Pasaquina, which was forced to sell its spot due to massive debt. The name of the new club is Once Deportivo FC.

Crest, colors and nicknames

The team's colors are yellow, white and blue, which have been the same since the club was founded.  Their home jerseys consist of a yellow shirt and shorts with blue socks. Their away jerseys consist of blue shirts and shorts with yellow socks. 

Their crest is made up of the number 11, representing the Municipality of Ahuchapan, and the canary, which is the team mascot and symbol.

The nickname given to Once Municipal is Canarios, a reference to their Canary mascot.

Stadium

Once Municipal played their home games at the Estadio Simeón Magaña, which has a capacity of 5,000 people. It is located in the city center of Ahuachapan. Prior to the construction of its stadium, the club trained and played home games at the Llano del Espino in Canchas.
 1946–73: Llano del Espino Canchas
 1974–2017: Estadio Simeón Magaña

Supporters
Once Municipal are renowned in El Salvador for the support that the team receives, especially at home games. Once Municipal's fan club is called the "Fuerza Canaria". The "Fuerza Canaria" is an ultra group that supports the team at games by singing songs, waving banners and flags, and wearing the team's colors.

Kit manufacturers and shirt sponsors

Kit manufacturers
 2006–2017 :    Milan

Shirt sponsors
 TBD: None
 2006–2010: Tigo, La Geo, Pilsener, MK, Fila
 2011: Tigo, La Geo
 2011–2013: La Geo, La Tropicano
 2014–2016: La Geo
 2016: Megafrio, Servitroya, Titanium
 2017: TCS, TropiGas, LaGeo, SalvaCola

Records

Club Records
 First Match (prior to creation of a league): vs. TBD, 1946
 First Match (official):  vs. Ferrocarril 3-1 (a club from  La Libertad,), August 1946
 Most points in La Primera: 41 points (13 win, 15 draws, 5 losses) 1986/87
 Least points in La Primera: 11 points (1 win, 8 draws, 27 losses) 1996/97

Individual records
 Most capped player for El Salvador: 50 (0 whilst at Once Lobos), Luis Guevara Mora
 Most international caps for El Salvador while a Once Lobos player: 1, TBD
 Most goals in a season, all competitions: unknown player, 62 (1927/28) (47 in League, 15 in Cup competitions)
 Most goals in a season, La Primera: TBD, 7

Overall seasons table in La Primera
{|class="wikitable"
|-bgcolor="#efefef"
!  Pos.
! Club
! Season In La Primera
! Pl.
! W
! D
! L
! GS
! GA
! Dif.
|-
|align=center bgcolor=|TBA
|Once Municipal
|align=center |11
|align=center|310
|align=center|77
|align=center|108
|align=center|125
|align=center|340
|align=center|439
|align=center|-99
|}

Last updated: 9 October 2022

Players

Notable players 
Below are the notable former and current players who have represented Once Municipal and international competition since the club's foundation in 1912. To appear in the section below, a player must have either played in at least 50 official matches for the club or represented their country's national team playing for Once Municipal before, during or after departing the club.   
 Dagoberto Portillo
 Elder Figueroa
 Ramon Flores
 Héctor Ávalos
 Mario Deras
 Kevin Santamaria
 Francisco Portillo
 Carlos Menjivar
 Elias Montes
 Israel Castro Franco
 Armando Collado
 Ronald Pimentel
 Osael Romero
 Anel Canales
 Diego Mejia
 Juan Ramon Martinez
 Gustavo Guerrero 
 José Rodolfo “Chofo” Cea
 Jorge Adalberto ”Conejo” Lievano
 Rafael Búcaro
 Maximiliano Cubas
 Sean Fraser
 Raúl Alfredo Magaña
 Mario Antonio Monge 
 José Antonio Quintanilla
 Jorge Suárez Landaverde

Notable Players

Team captains

Personnel

Current technical staff

Management

Coaches

1940s
 Armando Chanco (1949–50)

1950s
 Armando Chanco (1949–50)

1960s
 José Alberto Cevasco Che (1965)

1970s
 Salvador Alfonso Cabeza (1970)
 Julio “Merienda” Olivares (1972) 
 Carlos Javier Mascaro (1975-77)
 Jorge Roldán (1976–78)
  Rodolfo Cea Chofo (1977)

1980s
  Conrado Miranda (1986–1987)

1990s
 Cristo Arnoldo Velásquez Farfán (1991–1992)
 Carlos Recinos (1993–1995)
 Oscar Emigdio Benítez (1998–99)

2000s
  Jorge Tupinambá (2001–02)
 Marco Pineda (2002–03)
 Oscar Emigdio Benítez (2004)
 Henry Rojas (2004)
 Miguel Mansilla (2005–06)
 Jorge Alberto García (June 2006)
 Nelson Mauricio Ancheta (July 2006– June 2007)
 Abel Moralejo (July 2007 -Oct 2007)
 Hugo Coria (Oct 2007 – March 2008)
 Juan Ramón Paredes (March 2008 – April 2008)
 Mario Elias Guevara (April 2008 – May 2008)
 Jorge Abrego (June 2008 – Oct 09)
 Nelson Mauricio Ancheta (Oct 2009 – Dec 09)

2010s
 Ricardo Mena Laguán (Jan 2010 – April 10)
 Nelson Mauricio Ancheta (April 2010 – Feb 11)
 Marcos Pineda (Feb 2011 – March 11)
 Juan Andrés Sarulyte (March 2011 – April 2012)
 Leonel Cárcamo (June 2012 – Aug 2012)
 Juan Andrés Sarulyte (Aug 2012 – Oct 2013)
 Ivan 'Diablo' Ruiz (Nov 2013– Dec 2014)
 Marco Pineda (Dec 2014– May 2015)
 Giovanni Trigueros (June 2015 – Feb 2016)
 Sandra Martinez (Feb 2016)
 Rubén Guevara (Mar 2016– Aug 2016)
 Victor Coreas (Sep 2016– Dec 2016)
 Juan Andrés Sarulyte (Jan 2017– June 2017)
 Ivan Ruiz (July 2017 – Nov 2017)
 Ernesto Iraheta (Dec 2017 – Dec 2017)
Hiatus (January 2018 - Present)

Others
 José Leteliel

List of presidents
 Alfonso Salaverria (1946–1959)
 Antonio Salaverria (1970–1979)
 Ricardo Espinoza (1979–1999)
 Adalid Magaña (1999–2009)
 Andrés Rodríguez Celis (2009–2012)
 Oswaldo Magaña (2012–2016)
  Carlos Calderón (2016)
 Omar Maldonado (2016–2018)

Others
 José Orlando Contreras

Honors

References

External links
 Official website 
 History & club information 
 Ambitions to promotion article 

Football clubs in El Salvador
1945 establishments in El Salvador
Association football clubs established in 1945